Macey is a ghost town in Brazos County, in the U.S. state of Texas. It is located within the Bryan-College Station metropolitan area.

History
Macey was named for William Macy who moved to the area from Indiana and bought land in 1869 from Thomas James' land grant. He was the uncle of outlaws Frank and Jesse James, who hid out in his home from authorities in Missouri. This caused Macey to be a crime-ridden community, with the most common being robberies. A post office was established at Macey in 1874 and remained in operation until 1905. It operated inside Samuel Lipscombe's general store. It continued to operate in 1884 alongside a church, a gristmill, two cotton gins, and 150 inhabitants. It plummeted to 60 in 1950, with another general store being built and a physician's office. There were several scattered houses, a church, and a cemetery in 1948. It continued to be listed on maps in 1982 but with no further information.

Geography

Education
Macey had its own school in 1884. Today, Macey is located within the Bryan Independent School District.

References

Ghost towns in Texas